The Pulszky family of Hungary included several notable people:

 Ferenc Pulszky (1814–1897), writer and politician
 Károly Pulszky (1853–1899), art collector, Ferenc's son
 Romola de Pulszky, ballerina, wife of Vaslav Nijinsky, Károly's daughter

See also
List of titled noble families in the Kingdom of Hungary

Hungarian nobility
Hungarian people of Polish descent
Slavic-language surnames
Hungarian-language surnames